Iñigo Vélez de Mendizábal Fernández de Garaialde (born 15 March 1982), known as Iñigo or Vélez, is a Spanish retired footballer who played as a forward, currently the manager of CD Lugo.

Playing career
Born in Vitoria-Gasteiz, Álava, Vélez began his career in the lower leagues, playing for local CD Aurrerá de Vitoria and RCD Espanyol's B team. In the summer of 2004 he signed for SD Eibar of the Segunda División, scoring four goals in 40 games in his second season as they were eventually relegated.

Íñigo competed in La Liga with Real Murcia in 2007–08, in another relegation-ending campaign. He made his debut in the competition as a late substitute in a 2–0 away loss against Villarreal CF on 23 September 2007, netting two months later in a 1–1 draw at RCD Mallorca.

The following season, Vélez joined Athletic Bilbao, but took almost no part whatsoever in the Basque side's campaign (only five competitive matches). His contract was mutually terminated in late July 2009, and he joined relegated CD Numancia on a three-year deal, with the former club being able to re-buy in 2010 or 2011 – Athletic teammate Joseba Garmendia also made the move.

Iñigo continued playing in the second tier in 2011–12, penning a two-year contract with Xerez CD. After suffering relegation in 2013, and following an unsuccessful trial with CD Guadalajara, he decided to retire due to recurrent injury problems.

Coaching career
On 13 May 2016, Vélez was appointed manager of amateurs UD Aretxabaleta. On 2 June 2018, he signed with SD Amorebieta in the same capacity. With a 1–0 playoff win at CD Badajoz on 22 May 2021, he guided the team to the second division for the first time in their history.

Vélez was dismissed by Amorebieta on 8 March 2022. On 7 March 2023, after almost a year without a club, he was named manager of CD Lugo in the second level, becoming their fourth coach of the season.

Managerial statistics

References

External links

1982 births
Living people
Footballers from Vitoria-Gasteiz
Spanish footballers
Association football forwards
La Liga players
Segunda División players
Segunda División B players
CD Aurrerá de Vitoria footballers
Athletic Bilbao footballers
RCD Espanyol B footballers
SD Eibar footballers
Real Murcia players
CD Numancia players
Xerez CD footballers
Spanish football managers
Segunda División managers
Segunda División B managers
SD Amorebieta managers
CD Lugo managers